Erythrochrus notabilis is a moth in the family Hyblaeidae described by Schaus in 1911.

References

Hyblaeidae